Juan Alexis Ubillús Calmet (born 30 December 1972 in Lima) is a retired Peruvian footballer who played as a left back.

Club career
Ubillús played for a number of clubs in Peru, including Universitario, FBC Melgar and Alianza Lima.

International career
Ubillús made 11 appearances for the senior Peru national football team from 1994 to 2001.

References

External links

1972 births
Living people
Footballers from Lima
Association football fullbacks
Peruvian footballers
Peru international footballers
Peruvian Primera División players
Sporting Cristal footballers
Club Universitario de Deportes footballers
Deportivo Municipal footballers
FBC Melgar footballers
Club Alianza Lima footballers
Coronel Bolognesi footballers
Estudiantes de Medicina footballers
Club Deportivo Universidad de San Martín de Porres players
Club Deportivo Universidad César Vallejo footballers
1995 Copa América players